Laura Ravetto (born 25 January 1971) is an Italian politician.

Born in Cuneo, Ravetto graduated in Law at the Catholic University of Milan, and worked as a legal director in a multinational pharmaceutical company. She was first elected at the Italian parliament in 2006 with Forza Italia, and was subsequently re-elected in 2008 and 2013 with The People of Freedom. Ravetto was Undersecretary of State of the Department for Relations with Parliament between March 2010 and November 2011.

Early life and career
Graduated in Law from the Catholic University of the Sacred Heart in Milan, before entering politics she worked as director of legal affairs at the Italian subsidiary of the pharmaceutical multinational Schering Plow.

Politics
In the 2006 political elections she was elected to the Chamber of Deputies, on the Forza Italia lists in the Lombardy 1 constituency.
She was then re-elected in 2008 on the list of the People of Freedom. She was assigned the position of president of the Italian parliamentary delegation at the Central European Initiative.

Following the National Congress of 27–29 March 2009 in Rome, she was appointed National Head of the Communication, image, propaganda sector of the People of Freedom. On 23 April 2009 in Rome, the President of the Chamber Gianfranco Fini, on the occasion of the meeting with the President of the Romanian Chamber of Deputies, Roberta Anastase, appointed her President of the Italy-Romania friendship group.

She was nominated for the 2009 European Parliament election in the north-western Italy constituency in the PdL list, obtaining 7,715 preferences, not enough to be elected.

On 1 March 2010 she was appointed Undersecretary of State for relations with the Parliament of the Berlusconi IV government and remained in office until 16 November 2011.

In the 2013 parliamentary election she was re-elected deputy for the PdL in the Lombardy 2 constituency.

In the 2018 election she has been re-elected to the Chamber in the uninominal constituency of Como. On 6 October 2019 she has been appointed head of the immigration department of Forza Italia.

On 19 November 2020, she abandoned Forza Italia to join the League.

Personal life
Since 4 June 2016 she is married to the former deputy of the Democratic Party Dario Ginefra. Walter Veltroni united them in marriage.

In January 2018, at the age of 47, she became the mother of a little girl, Clarissa Delfina.

References

External links 
Italian Chamber of Deputies - Laura Ravetto

1971 births
Living people
People from Cuneo
Forza Italia politicians
The People of Freedom politicians
Forza Italia (2013) politicians
Deputies of Legislature XV of Italy
Deputies of Legislature XVI of Italy
Deputies of Legislature XVII of Italy
Deputies of Legislature XVIII of Italy
Politicians of Piedmont
21st-century Italian women politicians
Università Cattolica del Sacro Cuore alumni
Women members of the Chamber of Deputies (Italy)